The Witches and the Grinnygog is a children's novel by the writer Dorothy Edwards, published in 1981  and shortlisted for that year's Whitbread Prize for a children's book.

The Witches and the Grinnygog is a story of pre-Christian traditions, considered in the middle ages to be witchcraft, surviving into the modern world, and deals with various themes related to English folklore, ghosts and time slips.

Plot summary
When an ancient English church is moved to a new site, one stone – a strange statue, the Grinnygog – is found to be missing. It is accidentally found by a woman who, not realizing its significance, gives it to her elderly father as a pseudo garden gnome.  Shortly thereafter, three eccentric old women (who seem to be looking for something lost or hidden many years before) arrive in the town.

References 

1981 British novels
British children's novels
Witchcraft in written fiction
1981 children's books
Faber and Faber books